Natalie Elizabeth Haigh (born 8 February 1989 is an English professional footballer who plays as a defender for Aston Villa of the FA WSL. She has previously played for Yeovil Town, Coventry United and Nordsjælland.

Early life
Haigh was born in Reading, but grew up in Wetherby and attended Boston Spa Sports College. She began playing football at nine years old and her first club was Wetherby Athletic.

Club career

Leeds United 
In August 2005, 16-year-old Haigh made her FA Women's Premier League National Division debut for Leeds United as a substitute in a 4–3 defeat at Arsenal. In May 2006 she started in Leeds's 5–0 FA Women's Cup final defeat by Arsenal. She joined Leeds City Vixens in 2009.

Yeovil 
Haigh rejoined Yeovil Town in February 2017 after previously being captain of the team. Haigh made six appearances that season and saw this as a great achievement after having recovered from a back injury received in 2015.

Aston Villa 
On 21 July 2019, Haigh joined Aston Villa alongside Shania Hayles and Charlotte Greengrass who signed on the same day. She made her debut on 18 August in a 3–2 home win over Sheffield United in the Women's Championship.

International career
At the 2011 Summer Universiade in Shenzhen, China, Haigh won a gold medal with the Great Britain Universities team.

Personal life
Haigh relocated to Gloucestershire to study at the University of Gloucestershire. Before turning professional with Aston Villa, she ran the women's football and futsal teams at Hartpury College.

References 

English women's footballers
Living people
Women's association football defenders
Aston Villa W.F.C. players
English expatriate sportspeople in Denmark
Coventry United W.F.C. players
Yeovil Town L.F.C. players
FC Nordsjælland (women) players
Expatriate women's footballers in Denmark
FA Women's National League players
Leeds City Vixens L.F.C. players
Cal State Bakersfield Roadrunners women's soccer players
Expatriate women's soccer players in the United States
English expatriate sportspeople in the United States
People from Wetherby
Footballers from West Yorkshire
1993 births